Anton L. Westgard (1865 in Norway – 3 April 1921), called "the Pathfinder", was a highway pioneer and photographer.

Westgard was appointed by Federal Highway Administration Director Logan Page to research appropriate locations for the first transcontinental highways. Westgard's 1911 cross-country field survey via automobile ultimately led to what would become the Lincoln Highway. Westgard also mapped the National Park to Park Highway for the Automobile Association of America in 1920.

Westgard Pass between the White and Inyo mountain ranges in the Basin and Range Province of California is named after Westgard.

Published works
"Motor Routes to the California Expositions" by A. L. Westgard, Motor Magazine, March 1915.

References

External links
Tales of a Pathfinder, Westgard's 1920 travelogue of some of his adventurous pathfinding trips.

1913 US tour at AutoGiftGarage.com

1865 births
1921 deaths
American photographers